Takami Ominami (大南 敬美, Ōminami Takami, born November 15, 1975) is a long-distance runner from Japan, whose main event is the marathon. She won the 2002 edition of the Rotterdam Marathon, clocking a personal best of 2:23:43. Ominami is one half of a world-record setting duo as she and her twin Hiromi (personal best 2:23:26) are the fastest marathoning sisters of all-time.

In 2001, she competed in the women's marathon at the 2001 World Championships in Athletics held in Edmonton, Alberta, Canada. She finished in 37th place.

Achievements
All results regarding marathon, unless stated otherwise

References

  
  Marathon Info

1975 births
Living people
Japanese female long-distance runners
Japanese twins
Place of birth missing (living people)
Twin sportspeople
Japanese female marathon runners
World Athletics Championships athletes for Japan
20th-century Japanese women
21st-century Japanese women